Hela Riabi (born 18 February 1987) is a Tunisian freestyle wrestler. At the 2016 Summer Olympics she competed in the Women's freestyle -63 kg.

References

External links
 

Olympic athletes of Tunisia
1987 births
Wrestlers at the 2016 Summer Olympics
Living people
African Games gold medalists for Tunisia
African Games medalists in wrestling
Competitors at the 2015 African Games
African Wrestling Championships medalists
21st-century Tunisian women